"Schunder-Song" is a punk rock song by German band Die Ärzte. It's the second track from their 1995 album Planet Punk. The song got the name from Die Ärzte's crew member Erik Schunder. It's about standing up to somebody who has bullied you all your life, and describes the revenge by beating the bully up. The music video features the band performing the song on a theatre stage.

The song was released as a single under the title "Ein Song namens Schunder" ("a song called Schunder").

Track listing
 "Schunder-Song" (Single-Edit) - 3:01
 "Regierung" - 2:32

Maxi single
 "Schunder-Song" (Single-Edit) - 3:01
 "Is ja irre" - 1:22
 "Regierung" - 2:32
 "Unholy" - 3:28

B-sides
 "Regierung" (Government) was initially titled "Regierung 1986" and released on a compilation.
 "Unholy" is the German version of the song by Kiss; it was first on the Kiss tribute album Kiss My Ass: Classic Kiss Regrooved.

Personnel
Farin Urlaub – lead vocals, guitar
Rodrigo González – bass
Bela B. – drums

Charts

1995 singles
Die Ärzte songs
Songs written by Farin Urlaub